Izidor Balažič (born 13 May 1991) is a Slovenian football goalkeeper who plays for Radomlje in the Slovenian PrvaLiga.

References

External links
PrvaLiga profile 
UEFA profile
Nogomania profile 

1991 births
Living people
People from Postojna
Slovenian footballers
Association football goalkeepers
NK Domžale players
Slovenian PrvaLiga players